The Roller Hockey African Club Championship was the biggest Roller hockey Clubs Championship in Africa.

Participated Teams in the last Championship

From South Africa: ACPP Pretoria and União Joanesburgo, from Angola: Juventude de Viana and Petro de Luanda, from Mozambique: Ferroviário de Maputo  and Desportivo de Maputo, from Egypt: El Dakhlia Roller Hockey

List of Winners

Number of Championships by team

External links
 Information about III Africa Cup

Africa websites
Egyptian Blog with information about III Africa Cup
2008 Championship
Juventude Viana wins II African Championship in Luanda

International
 Roller Hockey links worldwide
 Mundook-World Roller Hockey
Hardballhock-World Roller Hockey
Inforoller World Roller Hockey 
 World Roller Hockey Blog
rink-hockey-news – World Roller Hockey

 
Roller hockey competitions
Recurring sporting events established in 1991